Bruce Holland may refer to:

 Bruce Holland (American politician) (born 1968), member of the Arkansas State Senate
 Bruce Holland (Canadian politician), member of the Nova Scotia House of Assembly